Arthur F. Croft (January 23, 1855 – March 16, 1884) was an American Major League Baseball player.  He played for three teams during three-year professional and Major League career.

Career
Born in St. Louis, Missouri, Croft began his professional career in  when he joined the St. Louis Red Stockings of the National Association.  He played in 19 games that season, all of which he played in the outfield, and batted .200 in 75 at bats.

He split his playing time between first base and left field, and hit a career high .232, while scoring 23 runs, and had 27 RBIs.

The following season, Croft joined the Indianapolis Blues, also of the National League, his last season in the Major Leagues.  He played in all 60 of the team's games as the starting first baseman.  He batted .158 in 222 at bats, and scored 22 runs.

Croft finished his three-year career with a .195 batting average in 139 games, scored 50 runs, 45 RBIs, and hit 14 doubles.  He died in St. Louis on March 16, 1884 at the age of 29 of Typhoid Pneumonia, and is interred at Calvary Cemetery in St. Louis.

References

External links

1855 births
1884 deaths
19th-century baseball players
Baseball players from St. Louis
Major League Baseball first basemen
Major League Baseball left fielders
St. Louis Red Stockings players
St. Louis Brown Stockings players
Indianapolis Blues players
Deaths from pneumonia in Missouri
Davenport Brown Stockings players